This is a partial list of notable American Inuit, especially Iñupiat, who largely reside in Alaska. The Arctic and subarctic dwelling Inuit (formerly referred to as Eskimo) are a group of culturally similar indigenous peoples inhabiting Canada and Greenland.

 John Baker, dog musher, pilot and motivational speaker
 Irene Bedard, actor
 Ada Blackjack, castaway
 Rita Pitka Blumenstein, traditional doctor,
 Ramy Brooks, kennel owner and operator, motivational speaker, and dog musher
 Ray Mala, actor
 Uyaquk, Moravian missionary and linguistic genius

See also
 Lists of Inuit

 
Inuit
American Inuit
Inuit